Richard William Offenhamer (June 30, 1913 – August 7, 1998) was an American football and baseball player and football coach. He served as the head football coach at the University of Buffalo—now known as the University at Buffalo, from 1955 to 1965, compiling a record of 58–37–5. Offenhamer played college football and college baseball at Colgate University.

Playing career
A native of Buffalo, New York, Offenhamer starred in football as a halfback and in baseball as a catcher at Bennett High School and at Colgate University in Hamilton, New York. At Colgate, he started at right halfback on the 1934 football team, which lost only to Ohio State, and again on the successful 1935 team. For the Colgate baseball team, Offenhamer hit .380 as a senior, playing as both a catcher and an outfielder. He was also intramural light heavyweight boxing champion all four years.

Coaching career

Kenmore High School
After graduating from Colgate in 1936, he was an English teacher and the head football coach at Kenmore High School in Buffalo, New York. In 1939, he played summer baseball in the Cape Cod Baseball League, playing catcher for the league's Harwich Mariners. From 1936 through 1946, his Kenmore teams compiling an outstanding record of 50–7 capturing Niagara Frontier League championships in 1943, 1944 and 1945.

Colgate
From 1946 until 1955, he was the head coach of the freshmen football team at Colgate.

University of Buffalo
In 1955, Offenhamer was recruited by University of Buffalo President Dr. Clifford C. Furnas to revive the school's football team.  Offenhamer went on to serve as the head football coach at Buffalo from 1955 to 1965, compiling a record of 58–37–5. His 1958 team won the Lambert Cup as the top-rated small school in the East. Offenhamer was named by United Press International as Coach of the Week after the Bulls upset highly regarded Columbia University 34-14 on October 25, 1958. Offenhamer’s program at U.B. produced several individuals who went on to distinguished professional careers, including Gerry Philbin, a member of the 1968 Super Bowl champion New York Jets, and Buddy Ryan who was on Offenhamer's staff as the defensive line coach.

Honors and death
In 1984, Offenhamer was inducted in the University of Buffalo Athletics Hall of Fame, and in 1985, he was inducted in the Colgate Athletics Hall of Fame for baseball. In 1998, he was inducted into the Greater Buffalo Sports Hall of Fame. Offenhamer died at age 85, on August 7, 1998, at Millard Suburban Hospital in Amherst, New York.

Head coaching record

References

External links
 Greater Buffalo Sports Hall of Fame profile
 

1913 births
1998 deaths
American football halfbacks
Baseball catchers
Baseball outfielders
Buffalo Bulls football coaches
Cape Cod Baseball League players (pre-modern era)
Colgate Raiders baseball players
Colgate Raiders football players
Harwich Mariners players
High school football coaches in New York (state)
Players of American football from Buffalo, New York
Coaches of American football from New York (state)
Baseball players from Buffalo, New York